Nutritionally Sound is a collaborative album by Marc Mylar and Zoogz Rift, released in 1990 by Trigon Records.

Track listing

Personnel 
Adapted from the Nutritionally Sound liner notes.
 Marc Mylar – tenor saxophone
 Zoogz Rift – lead vocals, guitar, production

Release history

References

External links 
 War Zone (Music for Obnoxious Yuppie Scum) at Discogs (list of releases)

1990 albums
Collaborative albums
Zoogz Rift albums